Made to Order is a Canadian lifestyle show airing in more than 150 countries, including the Food Network and Fine Living in Canada, Fine Living in the US, Discovery Travel, and Living in Asia, Australia, India and South America. It features the behind-the-scenes of the running of rain, a high-end restaurant in Toronto, Ontario run by Michael and Guy Rubino. It had 39 episodes.

References

Food Network (Canadian TV channel) original programming
Food reality television series
2000s Canadian cooking television series
2004 Canadian television series debuts
2006 Canadian television series endings